Protein is an organic compound made of amino acids.

Protein may also refer to:

 Protein (nutrient)
 Protein (band)
 Protein (dance company)

See also
 List of topics related to protein

es:Proteína (desambiguación)